Astroblast may refer to:

A version of Astrosmash, a 1981 video game
Astroblast!, a children's cartoon on the Sprout network
A short clip by Alexandre Lehmann from the episode "Worship" of the Adult Swim show Off the Air
A stomp rocket sold in the late 1970s
A differentiated neural stem cell which becomes an astrocyte